William Latimer is an infectious disease epidemiologist.

William Latimer may also refer to:

William Latimer (priest) (c. 1467–1545) was an English clergyman and scholar of Ancient Greek
William Latimer (Australian politician) (1858–1935), New South Wales politician
William Latimer, 4th Baron Latimer (1330-1381)
William Latymer  (1499–1583), English evangelical clergyman
William Latimer, 1st Baron Latimer (d. 1305), Baron Latimer
William Latimer, 2nd Baron Latimer (d. 1327), Baron Latimer
William Latimer, 3rd Baron Latimer (c. 1300–1335), Baron Latimer